The 1874–75 United States Senate elections were held on various dates in various states. As these U.S. Senate elections were prior to the ratification of the Seventeenth Amendment in 1913, senators were chosen by state legislatures. Senators were elected over a wide range of time throughout 1874 and 1875, and a seat may have been filled months late or remained vacant due to legislative deadlock. In these elections, terms were up for the senators in Class 1.

Although the Republican Party (the party of incumbent President Ulysses S. Grant) maintained their Senate majority, the Democratic Party gained nine seats.

Results summary

Colored shading indicates party with largest share of that row.

Change in Senate composition

Before the elections 
After the April 17, 1874, special election in Massachusetts.

Result of the elections

Beginning of the next Congress

Race summaries

Elections during the 43rd Congress 
In these elections, the winners were seated during 1874 or in 1875 before March 4; ordered by election date.

Races leading to the 44th Congress 
In these regular elections, the winners were elected for the term beginning March 4, 1875; ordered by state.

All of the elections involved the Class 1 seats.

Elections during the 44th Congress 
There were no special elections in 1875 to the 44th Congress.

Maryland 

William Pinkney Whyte won election for an unknown margin of votes for the Class 1 seat.

New York 

The New York election was held on January 19 and 20, 1875, by the New York State Legislature.

Republican Reuben E. Fenton had been elected in January 1869 to this seat, and his term would expire on March 3, 1875.

At the state election in November 1873, a Republican majority was elected for a two-year term (1874-1875) in the State Senate. At the State election in November 1874, Democrat Samuel J. Tilden was elected Governor, 75 Democrats and 53 Republicans were elected for the session of 1875 to the Assembly, and Democrat Albert P. Laning was elected in the 31st District to fill a vacancy in the State Senate. The 98th New York State Legislature met from January 5 to May 19, 1875, at Albany, New York.

The caucus of Democratic State legislators met on January 15, State Senator Albert P. Laning, of Buffalo, presided. All but one of the legislators were present, only Assemblyman John M. Roscoe, of Schoharie County, was sick. The caucus nominated Francis Kernan for the U.S. Senate. Kernan had been the Democratic/Liberal Republican candidate for Governor in November 1872 but had been defeated by John Adams Dix. Now Kernan was the choice of Tammany boss John Kelly who had succeeded the corrupt William M. Tweed. Kelly was opposed by John C. Jacobs, who proposed Ex-State Senator Henry C. Murphy, Jacobs's predecessor from the 3rd District, and the Democratic candidate who had lost the U.S. Senate elections in 1867 and 1869 when the Democrats were the minority. Kelly stood firm in his intention to dominate the Democratic Party, and had the caucus nomination made by viva voce vote instead of the more traditional secret ballot. Jacobs and Murphy had expected to get votes from many legislators who would not dare to cross Kelly openly, but had to abandon their hopes when the secret ballot was voted down 74 to 13.

The caucus of the Republican State legislators nominated Ex-U.S. Senator from New York Edwin D. Morgan.

On January 19, the Democratic majority of the Assembly nominated Francis Kernan, and the Republican majority of the State Senate nominated Ex-U.S. Senator Edwin D. Morgan. On January 20, both Houses met in joint session to compare nominations, and finding that they disagreed, proceeded to a joint ballot. Francis Kernan was elected, the first Democratic U.S. Senator from New York since 1851 when Daniel S. Dickinson left office.

Note: The vote for Ex-Governor of New York Hoffman was cast by Reuben E. Fenton's brother-in-law Samuel Scudder, a Democratic Assemblyman from Cattaraugus County.

Pennsylvania 

The Pennsylvania election was held on January 19, 1875.  The Pennsylvania General Assembly, consisting of the House of Representatives and the Senate, elected William A. Wallace.

|-
|-bgcolor="#EEEEEE"
| colspan="3" align="right" | Totals
| align="right" | 251
| align="right" | 100.00%
|}

West Virginia 
On January 26, 1875, each house of the West Virginia Legislature held the first ballot of the Senate election, with no person receiving the majority of votes in either chamber. Pursuant to the 1866 Act regulating the election of senators (S.414), the legislature convened into a joint assembly the following day and held further voting. After 23 ballots held jointly, Allen T. Caperton received the majority of votes on February 17, 1875, and was declared duly elected as senator. Votes for senator across the 24 rounds were mostly scattered, with Caperton, the eventual winner, only starting out with 6 votes in the first joint ballot, and receiving only 30 (13 votes short) on the round before his victory.

See also
 1874 United States elections
 1874–75 United States House of Representatives elections
 43rd United States Congress
 44th United States Congress

Notes

References

 Party Division in the Senate, 1789-Present, via Senate.gov
Members of the 44th United States Congress, via GPO.gov
NEW-YORK ELECTIONS.; Results of the Official Canvass for the Various Officers in NYT on November 19, 1874
THE SENATORSHIP.; FRANCIS KERNAN'S SWEEPING VICTORY in NYT on January 16, 1875
ALBANY.; ELECTION OF KERNAN TO THE SENATE in NYT on January 21, 1875
Pennsylvania Election Statistics: 1682-2006 from the Wilkes University Election Statistics Project